Marquez "Mark" Ocampo Go (born September 28, 1952) is a Filipino businessman and politician. A member of the Nacionalista Party, he is the incumbent representative of the legislative district of Baguio since 2016. He is also an outstanding citizen of Baguio awardee in 1998.

Early life and education 
Go was born on September 28, 1952. During his elementary and high school education, he was a consistent honor student. He finished his AB Political Science at the University of the Philippines in 1975. He would go on to obtain his Master of Management from the same university in 1979.

Professional career 
Go has a sleuth of career experiences including a multitude of management positions under his belt.:

Political career

2010 Mayoralty Bid 
Go entered the political arena in 2010 when he mounted his bid as Mayor of the City of Baguio as an independent candidate. He went against political heavyweights, such as then Representative Mauricio Domogan and then Councilor Jose Molintas. Go would lose in his 2010 bid to Cong. Domogan.

2013 Congressional Bid 
In 2013, Go would go on to try and win the seat for Baguio's lone legislative district under the Liberal Party. He went against incumbent Congressman Bernardo Vergara and Councilor Nicasio Aliping Jr. He finished as second in this election, garnering 31,529 against Congressman-elect Aliping's 33,402.

2016 Congressional Bid

Election 
Go tried once more to win the congressional seat of Baguio, this time under the Nacionalista Party. With 45,482 votes, he secured the congressional seat beating incumbent Cong. Aliping's 40,459 votes and former Cong. Vergara's 20,553.

17th Congress 
During his first term as congressman, Go would go on to author 65 bills and co-author several others, now signed into law. Some of them include:

 RA 10931 – Universal Access to Quality Tertiary Education
 RA 11036 – National Mental Health Act
 RA 11084 – Increasing the bed capacity of Baguio General Hospital and Medical Center (BGHMC)
 RA 11223 – Universal Health Care Act of 2019
 HBN 6974 – Baguio, La Trinidad, Itogon, Sablan, Tuba, and Tublay Development Authority (BLISTTDA)
 HBN 9156 – Free Dialysis and Renal Treatment to Indigent Patients

2019 Re-election Bid

Election 
In 2018, Go filed his certificate of candidacy for his re-election as the city's congressman, with contenders including Mayor Mauricio Domogan and former Congressman Aliping. News circulated before the May elections claiming that his HBN 6974 would result in the displacement of residents of Barangays Quirino Hill and Pinget, which Go denied. Multiple other accusations of harassment by Go's camp on Anti-BLISTTDA proponents were also denied. These claims would later be proved false after the election. On May 14, 2019, he won in his re-election campaign, garnering a total vote of 58,603 over Domogan's 30,443 votes, his nearest opponent. This would be Domogan's first ever political defeat. He was proclaimed along with Mayor-elect Benjamin Magalong and Vice Mayor-elect Faustino A. Olowan.

18th Congress 
In the 18th Congress, Go refiled nine bills- six with national significance and implementation, and three for implementation in Baguio and Benguet:

HBN 1377 - Baguio, La Trinidad, Itogon, Sablan, Tuba, and Tublay Development Authority or BLISTTDA
HBN 1338 - Increase the number of service incentive leave credits from the current five days to 10 days
HBN 1339 -  Establish a dialysis unit in a government hospital in every province and/or region 
HBN 1340 - Response to climate change
HBN 1341 - Burnham Park, Baguio as a national heritage
HBN 1342 -  Full rehabilitation and maintenance of the Kennon Road 
HBN 1343 - Provide health, retirement and other benefits to golf caddies and other independent workers who render their services to golf clubs
HBN 1344 - Establish the Barangay Road Development (BRD) Program
HBN 1391 - Advance centenarian cash gift grants of PHP25,000 upon reaching the age of 85, PHP25,000 upon reaching the age of 90, PHP50,000 upon reaching the age of 95 and PHP100,000 upon reaching the age of 100

Other bills filed by Go during the 18th Congress:

HBN 2576 - Standard compensation for barangay officials, workers, and Sangguniang Kabataan officials
HBN 4222 - Proper installation and maintenance of public utility cables and wires
HBN 4263 - Establish the Philippine Entrepreneurs Academy
HBN 4813 - Graduating students for Reforestation Act of 2019

2022 Re-election Bid

Election 
On October 10, 2021, he filed his COC for re-election, gunning for a third consecutive term since being elected in 2016. He will face off with former Rep. Nicasio Aliping, Alexis Albano, Edgardo Duque, Reynaldo Diaz Jr. and Rafael Wasan.

Awards and citations 
 1994 Outstanding Rotary Club President
 1998 Fellow in Personnel Management
 1998 Outstanding Citizen of Baguio
 2002 Outstanding Rotary Governor (Worldwide)
 2012 Service above self awardee Rotary international
 2015 Distinguished Alumni Service Awardee, UP Alumni Association

The Lyceum Northwestern University conferred Doctor of Humanities, honoris causa on Go in 2002.

References 

Living people
1952 births
Members of the House of Representatives of the Philippines from Baguio
Nacionalista Party politicians